The 1981 Caesars Palace Grand Prix was a Formula One motor race held on October 17, 1981, in Las Vegas, Nevada, United States. It was the fifteenth and final race of the 1981 FIA Formula One World Championship.

The 75-lap race was won by Australian driver Alan Jones, driving a Williams-Ford, with Frenchman Alain Prost second in a Renault and Italian Bruno Giacomelli third in an Alfa Romeo. Brazilian Nelson Piquet finished fifth in his Brabham-Ford to take the Drivers' Championship by one point from Jones's Argentine teammate, Carlos Reutemann, who finished eighth having started from pole position. This was the final win by an Australian driver until Mark Webber won the 2009 German Grand Prix.

Summary

Championship permutations

Going into this race, three drivers were in contention for the World Championship. Argentine Carlos Reutemann, driving a Williams-Ford, had 49 points having won two races, while Brazilian Nelson Piquet, driving a Brabham-Ford, had 48 having won three. Frenchman Jacques Laffite, driving a Ligier-Matra, had an outside chance on 43, having won two races including the previous race in Canada.

Laffite needed to win this race with Reutemann finishing no higher than fourth and Piquet no higher than third, or to finish second with neither Reutemann nor Piquet finishing in the top six. If Laffite won with Piquet third and Reutemann fourth, then all three drivers would finish on 52 points, and the Frenchman would then win the Championship on a tie-break, with the same number of wins as Piquet but more second places than the Brazilian (two to one). He would also win the Championship if he finished second with neither Reutemann nor Piquet scoring, as he and Reutemann would both have 49 points and the same numbers of wins and second places, but he would have more third places than the Argentine (three to two).

If Laffite failed to finish first or second, then all Reutemann had to do was finish ahead of Piquet, while Piquet had to finish in the top five and ahead of Reutemann.

The setting
This was the third year in succession that the United States hosted the final round of the World Championship. This time, however, it took place in Las Vegas, instead of Watkins Glen in upstate New York: after twenty years on the Grand Prix schedule, the organizers at Watkins Glen were unable to fulfill financial obligations for 1981.

The track, created on the parking lot of the Caesars Palace hotel, had a smooth surface and provided speeds averaging over 160 km/h or 100 mph, as well as plenty of overtaking opportunities. Unusually, however, its direction was counter-clockwise, which strained the drivers' necks. This, together with the desert heat, meant that the drivers' endurance would be tested in the extreme all weekend. Even in practice, Piquet suffered noticeably and became physically sick; he later got a 90-minute massage from Sugar Ray Leonard's masseur to help sort out his troubled back and "Las Vegas neck".

Qualifying

The Williams drivers, Alan Jones and Reutemann, were fastest from the start of the first practice with points leader Reutemann the faster of the two. Later, Jones became the only other driver to break 1:18 in qualifying, and the starting front row was all Williams. Reutemann was not expecting any help winning the Championship from teammate Jones, who explained, "I don't see how I can help him; I would not go holding up people as I am a member of the British Commonwealth (Australia, specifically) and I would consider that unsporting."

Race

In the race on Saturday, Jones jumped off the line into the lead, but Reutemann was quickly passed by Gilles Villeneuve, Alain Prost and Bruno Giacomelli, and finished the first lap in fifth. By the end of lap two, Jones had a five-second lead. Further down the field Patrick Tambay lost control of his Ligier, hitting a tyre wall positioned ahead of a concrete barrier with a force high enough to tear off the front of his car. Luckily, Tambay escaped with only minor injuries. Prost passed Villeneuve on lap three, but could not get close enough to challenge Jones for the lead. Villeneuve, meanwhile, kept a line of cars behind him as he fought off the advances of Giacomelli. This allowed Mario Andretti to move right on to Piquet's tail, as he desperately tried to overtake Reutemann.

The Brazilian was nearly touching the back of the Williams as they approached the last left-hander before the pits on lap 17. Piquet got around Reutemann on the inside when Reutemann, fighting for the Championship, inexplicably braked early. Piquet said, "I saw his car getting worse oversteer, then he braked very early, I think in the hope I would run into him, but I saw it and passed easily." On the next lap, Andretti also went by. Piquet passed John Watson on lap 22, and put himself in a position to score points when he took over sixth place. Reutemann continued to slip backwards with gearbox trouble, having lost fourth gear as early as lap two.

The Ferrari team was trying to decide whether to call Villeneuve in on lap 23 after he had been disqualified for lining up on the grid improperly, but when he pulled off the track with an engine fire, the point was moot. On lap 30, crowd favorite Andretti retired from fourth place with broken suspension.

With 15 laps still to go, but a 40-second lead over Prost, Jones began pacing himself to the finish. Giacomelli was third, having worked his way back after spinning from fourth to tenth, and Nigel Mansell had passed Piquet for fourth.

Piquet, in fact, was on the verge of physical exhaustion with his head visibly rolling around in the cockpit, but he still held fifth place and the two points he needed for the Championship. Piquet's condition was the only question left about how the Championship would turn out, for Reutemann, driving without fourth gear, was passed by Watson and Laffite, dropping to eighth place on lap 69.

Laffite took sixth place and the final point from Watson on the last corner of the last lap, while Giacomelli missed taking second from Prost, on failing tires, by a few car lengths. Piquet took fifteen minutes to recover from heat exhaustion after making it to the finish, but he had collected the two points for fifth place, and was the new World Champion.

Classification

Qualifying

Race

Championship standings after the race

Drivers' Championship standings

Constructors' Championship standings

References

Further reading
 Rob Walker (February, 1982). "1st Las Vegas Grand Prix: The Chips Are Down". Road & Track, 136-140.
 Mike S. Lang (1992). Grand Prix!: Race-by-race account of Formula 1 World Championship motor racing. Volume 4: 1981 to 1984. Haynes Publishing Group. 

Caesars Palace Grand Prix
Caesars Palace Grand Prix
Caesars Palace Grand Prix
Caesars Palace